Stephen Bullock (October 10, 1735 – February 2, 1816) was a United States representative from Massachusetts. Born in Rehoboth in the Province of Massachusetts Bay, he attended the common schools, taught school, and was a captain of the Sixth Company in Col. Thomas Carpenter III's Regiment of Massachusetts militia during the Revolutionary War, and was in the Battle of Rhode Island in 1778. He was a delegate to the first State constitutional convention in 1780 and was a member of the Massachusetts House of Representatives in 1783, 1785, 1786, 1795, and 1796.

Bullock was elected as a Federalist to the Fifth Congress, serving from March 4, 1797 to March 3, 1799. He was judge of the Court of Common Pleas for Bristol County and from 1803 to 1805 was a member of the Governor's council. He died in Rehoboth; interment was in Burial Place Hill.

References

1735 births
1816 deaths
Massachusetts militiamen in the American Revolution
Members of the Massachusetts House of Representatives
Massachusetts state court judges
Federalist Party members of the United States House of Representatives from Massachusetts